Louis Edouard Albert Glineur (born 10 December 1849, date of death unknown) was a Belgian competitor in the sport of archery. Glineur competed in one event, taking third place in the Sur la Perche à la Pyramide competition. He is now considered by the International Olympic Committee to have won a bronze medal.  No scores are known from that competition.

See also
 Archery at the 1900 Summer Olympics

Notes
  - Prizes at the time were silver medals for first place and bronze medals for second, as well as usually including cash awards.  The current gold, silver, bronze medal system was initiated at the 1904 Summer Olympics.  The International Olympic Committee has retroactively assigned medals in the current system to top three placers at early Olympics.

References

External links

 

1849 births
Year of death missing
Archers at the 1900 Summer Olympics
Olympic archers of Belgium
Olympic bronze medalists for Belgium
Belgian male archers
Olympic medalists in archery
Medalists at the 1900 Summer Olympics
Sportspeople from Hainaut (province)
Place of death missing